Communist Party of La Rioja (in Spanish: Partido Comunista de La Rioja), is the federation of the Communist Party of Spain (PCE) in La Rioja. The party was registered with the Spanish Ministry of Interior on November 13, 1986.

The general secretary of the party is Montserrat García.

References

External links
Party website

1986 establishments in Spain
La Rioja
Political parties established in 1986
Political parties in La Rioja (Spain)